Agriculture in England is today intensive, highly mechanised, and efficient by European standards, producing about 60% of food needs with only 2% of the labour force. It contributes around 2% of GDP. Around two thirds of production is devoted to livestock, one third to arable crops. Agriculture was heavily subsidised by the European Union's Common Agricultural Policy and continues to be so after Brexit. The GDP from the farming sector is argued by some to be a small return on the subsidies given but is argued by others that subsidy boosts food security and therefore is justified in the same way defence spending is.

The main crops that are grown are wheat, barley, oats, potatoes, sugar beets, fruits and vegetables. The livestock that is raised include cattle and sheep. In the drier east, farmers grow wheat, barley, oats, potatoes, and sugar beets.

History
Based on studies of medieval manorial accounts eastern Norfolk and areas along the northern coast were among the most productive, devoting large areas to legume cultivation alongside wheat and barley. The planting of legumes, commonly used as a fodder crop, protected soil fertility due to their nitrogen fixing capabilities. In soils where this intensive cropping wasn't possible—the sandy soils of Breckland or Norwich, and the "Good Sands" in Norfolk's northwest—the fields were sown with rye and barley. 

Between the 16th century and the mid-19th century, Great Britain saw a massive increase in agricultural productivity and net output. (See: British Agricultural Revolution.)  New agricultural practices like enclosure, mechanisation, four-field crop rotation and selective breeding enabled an unprecedented population growth, freeing up a significant percentage of the workforce, and thereby helped drive the Industrial Revolution. By the early 19th century, agricultural practices, particularly careful selection of hardy strains and cultivars, had so improved that yield per land unit was many times that seen in the Middle Ages and before. In the late nineteenth century a slump badly affected arable farming, known as the Great Depression, which is usually dated from 1873 to 1896. The depression was caused by the dramatic fall in grain prices following the opening up of the American prairies to cultivation in the 1870s and the advent of cheap transportation with the rise of steam ships.

The 18th and 19th centuries also saw the development of glasshouses, or greenhouses, initially for the protection and cultivation of exotic plants imported to Europe and North America from the tropics. Experiments on plant hybridisation in the late 19th century yielded advances in the understanding of plant genetics, and subsequently, the development of hybrid crops. Storage silos and grain elevators appeared in the 19th century.

See also
The Agrarian History of England and Wales

Agriculture in the United Kingdom

Board of Agriculture (1793–1822)
Economics of English agriculture in the Middle Ages
General View of Agriculture county surveys
Oxford Farming Conference (OFC)
Anthony Fitzherbert Boke of Husbandry, 1523/34

References

Further reading
 Gregg, Pauline. A Social and Economic History of Britain: 1760–1950 (1950) online
 Kerridge, Eric (1967) The Agricultural Revolution. Taylor and Francis
  (information here)
Rowland Prothero, 1st Baron Ernle 
--do.--  and 5 later editions
 Thorold Rogers A History of Agriculture and Prices in England from 1259 to 1793'' (1866–1902), 7 vols. I, II (1866), III, IV (1882), V, VI (1887), VII, Part I, VII, Part II (1902)

External links